Soft Belarusization or soft Belarusification  is an element of the domestic policy of President of Belarus Alexander Lukashenko aimed at the gradual increase of the presence of Belarusian language and partial reversal of the ages of Russification of Belarus.

The first signs of this shift were noticed in 2014 when Lukashenko, for the first time, gave the Independence Day speech in Belarusian. There are several explanations given to this change. Lukashenko himself said it is a warning for those who "encroach on the unity of the nation". Alexander Yarashevich thinks it is an attempt to distance from Russia in view of the (then) recent events in Ukraine. It is also explained as an attempt to enhance the national identity of Belarus by catering to nationalist-oriented opposition movements.

The 2019  document "Doctrine of Information Security of the Republic of Belarus" says: "The Belarusian language, along with constitutionally established bilingualism in the state, contributes to enhancing national identity of the Belarusian society and formation of its spirituality. Expansion of social functions and communicative possibilities of the Belarusian language, its full and comprehensive development alongside other elements of national culture act as guarantor of the state’s humanitarian security." At the same time Belarusian officials use an evasive language to indicate the "soft Belarusization" means neither distancing from Russia nor a definite turn to the West.

There has also been an observed shift in the attitude to the historical Belarusian symbols and events, which were a sharp rift between the Belarusian establishment and the opposition, including the White-red-white flag and the anniversary of the Belarusian National Republic.

Two new monuments, to  Tadeusz Kościuszko and to Duke Algirdas, are also viewed as an element of enhancing the Belarusian identity as well as a confrontation with the Russian World: Kościuszko led a 1794 uprising against the Russian Empire and Algirdas expanded the territory of the Grand Duchy of Lithuania with the lands of the modern Belarus.

The scope of "soft Belarusization" remains limited. In particular, in 2019, the draft-law about the state support of Belarusian language was not accepted.

Even this "soft" policy caused enough criticism from Russia that Lukashenko himself spoke out: "It's disgusting to listen to some of the Russian partisan “tongues” that we've almost got soft Belarusization going on here, that we have something else going on here, that we are almost U-turning somewhere." Russian critics see this policy as Lukashenko's shift away from his support of the Belarus-Russia integration strategy.

References

Further reading
 Ivan Posokhin, "Soft Belarusization: (Re)building of Identity or “Border Reinforcement”", COLLOQUIA HUMANISTICA, no. 8, 2019, 
 Marin, A. (2020). Belarusian Nationalism in the 2010s: a Case of Anti-Colonialism? Origins, Features and Outcomes of Ongoing ‘Soft Belarusianisation’, Journal of Belarusian Studies, 9(1), 27-50. 

Politics of Belarus
Belarusian language
Alexander Lukashenko
Belarusian culture